Platycheirus nodosus, known as the twospear sedgesitter, is an uncommon species of syrphid fly observed in Canada and The Rocky Mountains. Hoverflies can remain nearly motionless in flight. The  adults are also  known as flower flies for they are commonly found on flowers from which they get both energy-giving nectar and protein-rich pollen. Larvae are aphid predators.

References

Diptera of North America
Hoverflies of North America
Syrphinae
Taxa named by Charles Howard Curran
Insects described in 1923